"Use My Voice" is a song by American rock band Evanescence. It was released on August 14, 2020, by BMG as the third single from the band's fifth studio album, The Bitter Truth. It was originally intended as the first single, but "Wasted on You" was released first due to the COVID-19 pandemic. It was nominated for the MTV Video Music Award for Best Rock Video in the 2021 MTV Video Music Awards.

Background
The song was written 'to celebrate the power of speaking out in order to promote a more just world'. In a press release, Amy Lee said, "This is an era of awakening, and full of powerful beauty. I hope to inspire others to seek truth, find their own voices and use them as I step up to use mine. Don't let anybody speak for you. Only you can do that." In order to reinforce the message of the song, Lee was also accompanied by vocals delivered by other fellow musicians such as Within Temptation's Sharon den Adel, violinist Lindsey Stirling, Halestorm's Lzzy Hale and The Pretty Reckless' Taylor Momsen, as well as some of Lee's personal friends and family members. The band also worked with registration organisation HeadCount as a way of encouraging people to register and vote on the 2020 United States presidential election.

In an interview for CBS This Morning, Lee stated that the first thing that inspired her on creating a song regarding public and political issues was a moment during the Stanford University sexual assault cases trial in which a victim said to her abuser that the only thing he could not take away was her voice. After that, Lee considered that it had been hypocritical of her remaining silent about things that affect the world and decided to work on both the song and being more explicit about politics.

Personnel
Credits adapted from Tidal.
 Evanescence – composer, lyricist, associated performer
 Amy Lee – vocals, piano, keyboards, additional programming
 Deena Jakoub – composer, backing vocals
 Lzzy Hale – backing vocals
 Carrie Lee – backing vocals
 Lori Lee – backing vocals
 Sharon den Adel – backing vocals
 Lindsey Stirling – backing vocals
 Taylor Momsen – backing vocals
 Amy McLawhorn – backing vocals
 Jen Majura – backing vocals
 Tiago Nunez – programmer
 Ted Jensen – mastering engineer
 Nick Raskulinecz – mixing engineer, recording engineer

Charts

Release history

References

2020 songs
2020 singles
Evanescence songs
Political songs